David Mikula (born 30 March 1983) is a retired Czech football player. He represented his country at youth level.

Career
Mikula headed on loan to SFC Opava in 2012 in order to play first-team football. At the end of the season, he headed to MFK Karviná on a permanent transfer. He was captain of Karviná in the 2013–14 season, as the club finished in 8th position. He left Karviná in summer 2014 following the expiry of his contract, returning to Opava on a two-year deal.

References

External links
 
 

Czech footballers
1983 births
Living people
Czech First League players
FK Dukla Prague players
SFC Opava players
MFK Karviná players
Association football defenders
MFK Vítkovice players
Czech National Football League players